Omer Pasha, also known as Omer Pasha Latas (24 September 1806 – 18 April 1871) was an  Ottoman field marshal and governor. Born in  Austrian territory to Serbian Orthodox Christian parents, he initially served as an Austrian soldier. When faced with charges of embezzlement, he fled to  Ottoman Bosnia in 1823 and converted to Islam; he then joined the Ottoman army, where he quickly rose through the ranks. Latas crushed several rebellions throughout the Ottoman Empire, and served as a commander in the Crimean War of 1853-1856, where he defeated the Russians at  Silistra (1854), regaining Bucharest and occupying the Danubian Principalities. He also won notable victories at Oltenița,  Eupatoria (1855) and participated in the Siege of Sevastopol (1854–1855). As a commander Omer Pasha was noted especially for his excellent strategic skills.

Early life

Omer Pasha was born Mihajlo Latas, an ethnic Serb and Orthodox Christian, in Janja Gora, at the time part of the Croatian Military Frontier of the Austrian Empire (in modern Plaški, Lika region, Croatia).

His father Petar served in the Austrian Army and in time was appointed lieutenant-governor of the Ogulin district. His uncle was an Orthodox priest. Mihajlo was an intelligent and lively child, if rather sickly. He developed a passion for the military, and on leaving school in Gospić, he went to a military school in Zadar and was accepted as a cadet in his father's Ogulin Regiment on the frontier. He had beautiful handwriting, and was assigned to clerical duties. There he might have languished, if his father had not upset someone along the corruption line and suffered a conviction for misappropriation. Mihajlo escaped charges of embezzlement, having stolen 180 florins from the military safe, by fleeing to the Ottoman Bosnia Eyalet in 1823.

Military career

After escaping to Bosnia and living rough for a time, Latas was offered, in 1828, a position as tutor to the children of a Turkish merchant, on condition that he converted from Christianity to Islam and was circumcised. After his conversion he took the new name Omer Lutfi. A necessary condition to fulfill in order to get off the streets, it was a huge cultural step that led naturally to his decision that his future lay with the Ottomans. The big break came for the newly named Omer when the family moved to Constantinople. By astute networking and doubtless exploiting his curiosity value as a European ex-military man, he was appointed lecturer at the Turkish Military Academy. With this exposure he shone enough to be snapped up as aide-de-camp to the Polish–Ottoman General Wojciech Chrzanowski, who was engaged in the re-organization of the Ottoman Army after the defeat of the Janissaries.

Now a major, Omer completed a mapping assignment in Bulgaria and the Danube territories, gaining detailed knowledge of the ground which was to serve him well in the future. Chrzanowski also milked his ideas for re-organizing the Army; in return he smoothed the way for Omar's introduction into Turkish society. He thereby met and married a rich heiress Adviye Hanım (a daughter of Çerkes Hafız Mehmed Pasha), the start of his meteoric rise in Ottoman military circles. There is no doubt that Omar's marriage opened all the right doors for him, but equally no doubt that he proved equal to the challenges of high command which resulted. He became writing-master to the Ottoman heir, Abd-ul-Medjid, and on the succession of the latter in 1839 was made a colonel. He was shortly afterwards appointed Military Governor of Constantinople. His only daughter, Saffet Hanım, married Mustafa Celalettin Pasha.

In 1840-41 he led a successful expedition to quell a revolt in Syria, and in 1842 was Governor of the Tripoli Eyalet (Lebanon). He won distinction in suppressing the Albanian Revolt of 1843–44, led by local Muslim aristocrats. There followed the expedition to Kurdistan following the Massacres of Badr Khan (1846). After the Hungarian Revolution of 1848, Omar Pasha was put in command of the Ottoman forces in Moldavia and Wallachia. His firm and effective handling of a powder keg situation involving potential confrontation with the Russian and Austrian armies demonstrated that he possessed considerable diplomatic skills. 

There followed his command in Bosnia (1850) where he executed Ali-paša Rizvanbegović of Stolac, who had defended Ottoman power during an earlier revolt but then started to build up an independent power base. Omer Pasha executed, plundered and abolished the respected historical aristocracy of the Muslim faith, in the interest of buttressing Ottoman central power. As the Governor of Bosnia, and leading Turkish official in the region he invaded neighbouring Montenegro.  The Austrians intervened forcing The Porte to withdraw their representative to Constantinople; it was a humiliating climbdown proving that Turkish administrative control was ebbing away in the face of the Great Powers. 

This was followed by a command in the Principality of Montenegro (1852). His chief services were rendered when the Crimean War broke out. In 1853 he successfully defended Calafat.  Omar made a powerful stand at Oltenitsa in southern Romania defeating (according to Turkish accounts) a numerically-superior Russian force under the indecisive General Pyotr Dannenburg. He entered Bucharest.  The Turkish ultimatum was ignored, and so on 27 October 1853 Omer Pasha marched his army over the River Danube creating what became known as The Eastern Crisis.  The Great Powers called halt to the impending conflict dragging the two combatants Russia and Turkey to the negotiating table.  By early December a meeting was fixed for London, and with Pasha one of the representatives.  But the naval battle called the 'massacre of Sinope' put an end to any hope of peace.  

In January 1854 he successfully persuaded Lord Raglan to keep his word by reinforcing Varna, while the French remained deeply sceptical of Omar's strategy to protect the Turkish army's flank on the Lower Danube.  His courageous defence of the garrison at Silistria bought invaluable time for the reinforcing allied armies that were arriving all the time, to get organised.  Omar's leadership showed the Russians their loss of control over the Black Sea must cause a compelling reason for commencement of a Russian withdrawal.  Despite later attempts by Raglan to get the Turks to launch an attack over the River Pruth with direct intention to provoke Austria into a defensive counter-attack, neither Vienna nor Pasha's forces would be drawn into such a cataclysm.  His firm management of the British in Constantinople helped to stabilise the front in Crimea after January 1855 when finally transports arrived to ferry Turkish troops to Crimea.  Turkish troops had just arrived from Wallachia when 19,000 Russians under Lt-Gen. Khrulev decided to attack the garrison at Yevpatoria.  The assault on 17 February 1855 was a fiasco in which 800 Russians were killed by superior Turkish artillery fire supported by the Royal Navy. 

A later achievement was his capture of Cetinje, Montenegro, during the Montenegrin–Ottoman War (1861–62), considered a difficult feat.

A clear and precise military thinker,  Omer Pasha took bold decisions and relentlessly followed them through. Although he had a reputation as a strict and ruthless disciplinarian, he was revered and respected by his men. A true professional, while the other allies struggled to come to grips with local campaigning conditions, he had seen it all too often before. Perhaps for that reason the allied troops found his expression cold and uninterested when seated on his horse plodding round their lines.

Timeline
Tutor in the household of Hussein Pasha, Governor of Widdin.
1834 - Writing master in a military school at Constantinople.
Instructor to Abd ul Medjid, heir apparent to the throne.
1842 - Appointed Governor of Lebanon.
1843 - Repressed insurrection in Albania.
1846 - Repressed insurrection in Kurdistan.
1850 - executed Ali-paša Rizvanbegović of Stolac, plundered and abolished the Bosniak elite
1852 - defeated the Montenegrins under Prince Danilo
1853 - Defeated the Russians at Olteniţa.
1854 - Successfully defended Silistria against Russians, gaining possession of Bucharest.
1855 - Repulsed the Russians at Yevpatoria, Crimea and captured Sukhumi in Caucasus.
1857-59 - Governor of Baghdad.
1862 - Defeated Montenegrin army and took possession of Cetinje.
1864 - Made field marshal.
1867 - Fought rebels in Crete.
1869 - Made Minister of war.

References

Sources

 
 
 
 
 
 
Chambers's biographical dictionary: the great of all times and nations by David Patrick, Francis Hindes Groome; W. & R. Chambers, limited, 1907 page 706
The Near East in Modern Times: The Ottoman Empire and the Balkan States to 1900, by G. G. Arnakis, Wayne S. Vucinich; Pemberton Press, 1969 pages 207, 345
Wars and Peace Treaties, 1816-1991 by Erik Goldstein; Routledge, 1992 page 24
The encyclopedia of nineteenth-century land warfare: an illustrated world view by Byron Farwell; W. W. Norton & Company, 2001 page 613
The Balkan Economies C. 1800-1914: Evolution Without Development by Michael R. Palairet; Contributors: Charles Feinstein, Patrick O'Brien, Barry Supple, Peter Temin, Gianni Toniolo; Cambridge University Press, 2004 page 133
Religious separation and political intolerance in Bosnia-Herzegovina by Mitja Velikonja; Texas A&M University Press, 2003 pages 85–86
History of the Balkans: Eighteenth and nineteenth centuries by Barbara Jelavich; Cambridge University Press, 1983 page 345
An Ethnohistorical Dictionary of the Russian and Soviet Empires by James S. Olson, Lee Brigance Pappas, and Nicholas C.J. Pappas; Greenwood Press (March 30, 1994) page 8
The Druzes And The Maronites Under The Turkish Rule From 1840 To 1860 by Charles Henry Churchill; Kessinger Publishing (June 30, 2004)  pages 64, 72–74,77-79
A military history of modern Egypt: from the Ottoman Conquest to the Ramadan War by Andrew James;  Greenwood Publishing Group, 2006 p121-122
The Turkish Empire; Its Historical, Statistical, and Religious Condition: Also Its Manners, Customs, Etc. by Alfred de Bessé, Edward Joy Morris, Contributors: John Fagan and Thomas S. Sinclair; Lindsay & Blakiston, 1854 pages 24–27
 

1806 births
1871 deaths
Pashas
Field marshals of the Ottoman Empire
Ottoman governors of Crete
Ottoman military personnel of the Crimean War
Converts to Islam from Eastern Orthodoxy
Former Serbian Orthodox Christians
Serbs from the Ottoman Empire
19th-century Serbian people
Honorary Knights Grand Cross of the Order of the Bath
19th-century Ottoman military personnel